Tatyana Dmitryevna Lesovaya (née , Starodubtseva; born April 24, 1956 in Taldykorgan) is a retired athlete who represented Soviet Union (until 1991) and later Kazakhstan. Competing in the discus throw, her greatest achievement was a bronze medal at the 1980 Summer Olympics. Her personal best throw was 68.18 metres, achieved in 1982.

References

1956 births
Living people
Kazakhstani discus throwers
Soviet female discus throwers
Olympic athletes of the Soviet Union
Olympic bronze medalists for the Soviet Union
Athletes (track and field) at the 1980 Summer Olympics
Medalists at the 1980 Summer Olympics
Olympic bronze medalists in athletics (track and field)
People from Taldykorgan